Hatfield Fountain, formally the Antoinette and Mark O. Hatfield Fountain and nicknamed "Chicken Fountain", is an outdoor 1989 fountain and sculpture by Tom Hardy, Lawrence Halprin, and Scott Stickney, installed at Willamette University in Salem, Oregon, United States.

History
Hatfield Fountain was designed by Tom Hardy, Lawrence Halprin, and Scott Stickney. It is named after Antoinette and Mark Hatfield, a former Oregon senator and Willamette University alumnus, and was dedicated on October 13, 1989.  According to Willamette University, the fountain serves as a popular reference point for campus gatherings. 

The Hatfield Fountain is administered by Willamette University. In July 1993, the fountain was surveyed and deemed as "well maintained" by the Smithsonian Institution's "Save Outdoor Sculpture!" program.

Description 

The work features two birds set on a fountain consisting of large stones arranged in two stacks, all set in a round basin. One bird sits atop each stack; the bird on the shorter stack is set in a bird nest of rods and carrying a twig in its mouth, and the bird on the taller stack has its wings spread. The birds are made of steel rods and cut bronze or steel sheet; one measures approximately  x  x , and another measures approximately  x  x . Water flows from one of the stacks into the basin. A nearby plaque reads: .

See also
 1989 in art
 Untitled (Hardy), Eugene, Oregon (1952)

References

External links
 
 Antoinette and Mark O. Hatfield Fountain, (sculpture) – Salem, Oregon at Waymarking
 Campus Map (PDF), Willamette University

1989 establishments in Oregon
1989 sculptures
Sculptures of birds in Oregon
Bronze sculptures in Oregon
Concrete sculptures in Oregon
Fountains in Salem, Oregon
Monuments and memorials in Salem, Oregon
Outdoor sculptures in Salem, Oregon
Steel sculptures in Oregon
Stone sculptures in Oregon
Willamette University campus